Cottondale is a town in Jackson County, Florida, United States. The population was 933 at the 2010 census, up from 869 at the 2000 census.

Cottondale has a police force of four to five sworn officers; the police chief is Willam Watford. Cottondale High School is located here.

Cottondale, with convenient four-lane highway access to both Dothan, Alabama, and Panama City, Florida

The town was one of several Florida Panhandle communities devastated by Hurricane Michael in 2018.

Geography

Cottondale is located in western Jackson County at  (30.796810, –85.376031). U.S. Route 90 passes through the south side of town on Levy Street. US-90 leads east  to Marianna, the Jackson county seat, and west  to Chipley. U.S. Route 231 runs through the center of Cottondale as Main Street, leading north  to Dothan, Alabama, and south  to Panama City.

Demographics

2020 census

As of the 2020 United States census, there were 848 people, 343 households, and 230 families residing in the town.

2000 census
As of the census of 2000, there were 869 people, 376 households, and 239 families residing in the town. The population density was 573.2 inhabitants per square mile (220.7/km2). The racial makeup of the town was 76.41% White, 18.64% African American, 0.35% Native American, 0.58% Asian, 0.58% from other races, and 3.45% from two or more races. Hispanic or Latino of any race were 4.14% of the population.

There were 376 households, out of which 31.1% had children under the age of 18 living with them, 41.0% were married couples living together, 19.4% had a female householder with no husband present, and 36.2% were non-families. 34.6% of all households were made up of individuals, and 17.3% had someone living alone who was 65 years of age or older.  The average household size was 2.31 and the average family size was 2.94.

In the town, the population was spread out, with 27.7% under the age of 18, 9.8% from 18 to 24, 24.3% from 25 to 44, 22.8% from 45 to 64, and 15.4% who were 65 years of age or older.  The median age was 36 years. For every 100 females, there were 83.7 males.  For every 100 females age 18 and over, there were 78.9 males.

The median income for a household in the town was $20,509, and the median income for a family was $26,667. Males had a median income of $24,545 versus $18,571 for females. The per capita income for the town was $11,266.  About 24.8% of families and 27.4% of the population were below the poverty line, including 34.3% of those under age 18 and 23.6% of those age 65 or over.

References

Towns in Jackson County, Florida
Towns in Florida